Francisco Ricardo Palladino Soba (born 23 January 1983) is a Uruguayan football manager, currently in charge of Chilean club Santiago Wanderers.

Career
Born in Maldonado, Palladino joined hometown side Deportivo Maldonado's youth setup in 2007. In September 2017, after Nelson Abeijón was sacked, he was named interim manager of the main squad in the Segunda División; he was in charge of the team in a match against Miramar Misiones before returning to his previous role.

On 6 February 2019, Palladino was definitely appointed manager of Depor for the 2019 campaign. He achieved promotion to the Primera División after finishing second in his first season, helping the side to return to the top tier after 15 years.

On 8 November 2022, after qualifying Maldonado to their first-ever continental championship (2023 Copa Libertadores), Palladino left the club, and was named in charge of Chilean Primera B side Santiago Wanderers.

References

External links

1983 births
Living people
People from Maldonado, Uruguay
Uruguayan football managers
Uruguayan Primera División managers
Uruguayan Segunda División managers
Deportivo Maldonado managers
Santiago Wanderers managers
Uruguayan expatriate football managers
Uruguayan expatriate sportspeople in Chile
Expatriate football managers in Chile